IU Aurigae is a triple star system in the constellation Auriga, consisting of an eclipsing binary pair orbiting a third component with a period of 335 years. This system is too faint to be viewed with the naked eye, having a peak apparent visual magnitude of 8.19. The eclipsing pair form a Beta Lyrae-type semidetached binary of two Bp stars with a period of 1.81147435 days. During the primary eclipse, the visual magnitude of the system drops to 8.89, while for the secondary it decreases to 8.74.

References

B-type main-sequence stars
Ap stars
Beta Lyrae variables
Spectroscopic binaries
Triple star systems

Auriga (constellation)
Durchmusterung objects
035652
025565
Aurigae, IU